About Us is a novel by the American writer Chester Aaron set in 1930s Pittsburgh, Pennsylvania.

It tells the story of the Kahns, a Jewish family who run a small general store in the fictional village of Sundown, a coal patch in Butler County, Pennsylvania outside of Pittsburgh. The protagonist is Benny Kahn, age eight when the novel begins, and his coming-of-age is sketched against the backdrop of the events of Great Depression through World War II.

References
 

1967 American novels
Jewish American novels
Novels set in Pennsylvania
Fiction set in the 1930s
Butler County, Pennsylvania
1967 debut novels